South Carolina Highway 150 (SC 150) is a  primary state highway in the U.S. state of South Carolina. The highway connects Pacolet and Gaffney with the more rural areas of Spartanburg and Cherokee counties.

Route description

SC 150 is a  two-lane rural highway.  In Gaffney, it goes through the downtown area along Limestone Street and overlaps with the Overmountain Victory National Historic Trail.

History
SC 150 was established in 1940 as a renumbering of part of SC 103, from SC 18 in Gaffney to the North Carolina state line.  In 1960-61, SC 150 was extended south to its current southern terminus at SC 56, replacing part of SC 18.

Major intersections

Pacolet truck route

South Carolina Highway 150 Truck (SC 150 Truck) is a  truck route that is partially within the city limits of Pacolet. It is almost entirely unsigned. Except for one sign on SC 150 at its northern terminus, it is only signed at turns and come curves as the SC 150 mainline. It is known as Victor Park and Sunny Acres Road.

It begins at an intersection with the SC 150 mainline (Stone Street) in the northeastern part of Pacolet. It travels to the north-northeast and immediately leaves the city limits of the town. The highway curves to the north-northwest and briefly re-enters the city limits. Here, it has an intersection with Sunny Acres Road. Here, Victor Park ends, and the truck route turns right. It departs the city limits again and takes Sunny Acres Road to the east-northeast. Upon encountering the Pacolet Mills Cloth Room and Warehouse, it curves to a nearly due-north direction and reaches its northern terminus, another intersection with the SC 150 mainline (Montgomery Avenue / Limestone Street).

See also

References

External links

 
 Mapmikey's South Carolina Highways Page: SC 150

150
Transportation in Spartanburg County, South Carolina
Transportation in Cherokee County, South Carolina